Blue Tornado is a 1991 Italian action thriller film directed by Antonio Bido and starring Dirk Benedict, Ted McGinley, and Patsy Kensit.

Plot
In the course of experimenting a new flight maneuver, two pilots, Colonel Alex Long (Benedict) and Philip (McGinley) encounter a mysterious light beyond a mountain range. Phil becomes transfixed by the light, flies into it and vanishes. Alex returns alone and shocked by what he has seen. Later the remains of his colleague's plane are found. As inquiries ensue, Alex begins to believe a UFO was involved. He is accused of creating the UFO story as an alibi against allegations he sabotaged Philip's plane. He later meets Isabella (Kensit) who is also researching UFOs. They embark on a mission to rescue Philip.

Cast
Dirk Benedict as Alex Long
Ted McGinley as Philip
Patsy Kensit as Isabella
David Warner as Commander
Christopher Ahrens

References

External links
 
 

1991 action thriller films
1991 films
Italian action thriller films
English-language Italian films
UFO-related films
Italian aviation films
1990s English-language films
1990s Italian films